This is a list of cricket grounds in England and Wales, listed in alphabetical order and based on each traditional English and Welsh county. The venues in this list have all been used for first-class matches. The venues have all staged first-class (from 1772), limited overs (from 1963) or Twenty20 (from 2003) matches. Venues used only for junior or minor matches are excluded. Some of the venues are dated to the 17th and 18th centuries and many are now defunct (marked by †).

International grounds
For a full list of grounds in England and Wales that have held men's international cricket, see List of international men's cricket grounds in England and Wales

Domestic grounds in England

Bedfordshire
For a full list of grounds that Bedfordshire County Cricket Club have used as home grounds in List A, Minor Counties Championship or MCCA Knockout Trophy cricket, see List of Bedfordshire County Cricket Club grounds

Berkshire
For a full list of grounds that Berkshire County Cricket Club have used as home grounds in List A, Minor Counties Championship or MCCA Knockout Trophy cricket, see List of Berkshire County Cricket Club grounds

Buckinghamshire
For a full list of grounds that Buckinghamshire County Cricket Club have used as home grounds in List A, Minor Counties Championship or MCCA Knockout Trophy cricket, see List of Buckinghamshire County Cricket Club grounds

Cambridgeshire
For a full list of grounds that Cambridgeshire County Cricket Club have used as home grounds in List A, Minor Counties Championship or MCCA Knockout Trophy cricket, see List of Cambridgeshire County Cricket Club grounds
For a full list of grounds that Cambridge University Cricket Club have used as home grounds in first-class and List A cricket, see List of Cambridge University Cricket Club grounds

Cheshire
For a full list of grounds that Cheshire County Cricket Club have used as home grounds in List A, Minor Counties Championship or MCCA Knockout Trophy cricket, see List of Cheshire County Cricket Club grounds

Cornwall
For a full list of grounds that Cornwall County Cricket Club have used as home grounds in List A, Minor Counties Championship or MCCA Knockout Trophy cricket, see List of Cornwall County Cricket Club grounds

Cumberland
For a full list of grounds that Cumberland County Cricket Club have used as home grounds in List A, Minor Counties Championship or MCCA Knockout Trophy cricket, see List of Cumberland County Cricket Club grounds

Derbyshire
For a full list of grounds that Derbyshire County Cricket Club have used as home grounds in first-class, List A or Twenty20 cricket, see List of Derbyshire County Cricket Club grounds

Devon
For a full list of grounds that Devon County Cricket Club have used as home grounds in List A, Minor Counties Championship or MCCA Knockout Trophy cricket, see List of Devon County Cricket Club grounds

Dorset
For a full list of grounds that Dorset County Cricket Club have used as home grounds in List A, Minor Counties Championship or MCCA Knockout Trophy cricket, see List of Dorset County Cricket Club grounds

Durham
For a full list of grounds that Durham County Cricket Club have used as home grounds in Minor Counties Championship, MCCA Knockout Trophy, first-class, List A or Twenty20 cricket, see List of Durham County Cricket Club grounds

Essex
For a full list of grounds that Essex County Cricket Club have used as home grounds in first-class, List A or Twenty20 cricket, see List of Essex County Cricket Club grounds

Gloucestershire
For a full list of grounds that Gloucestershire County Cricket Club have used as home grounds in first-class, List A or Twenty20 cricket, see List of Gloucestershire County Cricket Club grounds

Hampshire
For a full list of grounds that Hampshire County Cricket Club have used as home grounds in first-class, List A or Twenty20 cricket, see List of Hampshire County Cricket Club grounds
For a full list of grounds that Hampshire Cricket Board have used as home grounds in List A and MCCA Knockout Trophy cricket, see List of Hampshire Cricket Board grounds
For a full list of grounds that Hampshire county cricket teams used as home grounds in first-class cricket prior to the formation of Hampshire County Cricket Club, see List of Hampshire county cricket teams grounds

Herefordshire
For a full list of grounds that Herefordshire County Cricket Club have used as home grounds in List A, Minor Counties Championship or MCCA Knockout Trophy cricket, see List of Herefordshire County Cricket Club grounds

Hertfordshire
For a full list of grounds that Hertfordshire County Cricket Club have used as home grounds in List A, Minor Counties Championship or MCCA Knockout Trophy cricket, see List of Hertfordshire County Cricket Club grounds

Huntingdonshire
For a full list of grounds that Huntingdonshire County Cricket Club have used as home grounds in List A and MCCA Knockout Trophy cricket, see List of Huntingdonshire County Cricket Club grounds

Isle of Wight
For a full list of grounds that Hampshire County Cricket Club have used as home grounds in first-class cricket that have been based on the Isle of Wight, see List of Hampshire County Cricket Club grounds

Kent
For a full list of grounds that Kent County Cricket Club have used as home grounds in first-class, List A or Twenty20 cricket, see List of Kent County Cricket Club grounds

Lancashire
For a full list of grounds that Lancashire County Cricket Club have used as home grounds in first-class, List A or Twenty20 cricket, see List of Lancashire County Cricket Club grounds

Leicestershire
For a full list of grounds that Leicestershire County Cricket Club have used as home grounds in first-class, List A or Twenty20 cricket, see List of Leicestershire County Cricket Club grounds

Lincolnshire
For a full list of grounds that Lincolnshire County Cricket Club have used as home grounds in List A, Minor Counties Championship or MCCA Knockout Trophy cricket, see List of Lincolnshire County Cricket Club grounds

Middlesex
For a full list of grounds that Middlesex County Cricket Club have used as home grounds in first-class, List A or Twenty20 cricket, see List of Middlesex County Cricket Club grounds

Norfolk
For a full list of grounds that Norfolk County Cricket Club have used as home grounds in List A, Minor Counties Championship or MCCA Knockout Trophy cricket, see List of Norfolk County Cricket Club grounds

Northamptonshire
For a full list of grounds that Northamptonshire County Cricket Club have used as home grounds in Minor Counties Championship, first-class, List A or Twenty20 cricket, see List of Northamptonshire County Cricket Club grounds

Northumberland
For a full list of grounds that Northumberland County Cricket Club have used as home grounds in List A, Minor Counties Championship or MCCA Knockout Trophy cricket, see List of Northumberland County Cricket Club grounds

Nottinghamshire
For a full list of grounds that Nottinghamshire County Cricket Club have used as home grounds in first-class, List A or Twenty20 cricket, see List of Nottinghamshire County Cricket Club grounds

Oxfordshire
For a full list of grounds that Oxfordshire County Cricket Club have used as home grounds in List A, Minor Counties Championship or MCCA Knockout Trophy cricket, see List of Oxfordshire County Cricket Club grounds
For a full list of grounds that Oxford University Cricket Club have used as home grounds in first-class and List A cricket, see List of Oxford University Cricket Club grounds

Rutland
For a full list of grounds that Leicestershire County Cricket Club have used as home grounds in first-class and List A cricket that have been based in Rutland, see List of Leicestershire County Cricket Club grounds

Shropshire
For a full list of grounds that Shropshire County Cricket Club have used as home grounds in List A, Minor Counties Championship or MCCA Knockout Trophy cricket, see List of Shropshire County Cricket Club grounds

Somerset
For a full list of grounds that Somerset County Cricket Club have used as home grounds in first-class, List A or Twenty20 cricket, see List of Somerset County Cricket Club grounds
For a full list of grounds that Somerset Cricket Board have used as home grounds in List A and MCCA Knockout Trophy cricket, see List of Somerset Cricket Board grounds

Staffordshire
For a full list of grounds that Staffordshire County Cricket Club have used as home grounds in List A, Minor Counties Championship or MCCA Knockout Trophy cricket, see List of Staffordshire County Cricket Club grounds

Suffolk
For a full list of grounds that Suffolk County Cricket Club have used as home grounds in List A, Minor Counties Championship or MCCA Knockout Trophy cricket, see List of Suffolk County Cricket Club grounds

Surrey
For a full list of grounds that Surrey County Cricket Club have used as home grounds in first-class, List A or Twenty20 cricket, see List of Surrey County Cricket Club grounds

Sussex
For a full list of grounds that Sussex County Cricket Club have used as home grounds in first-class, List A or Twenty20 cricket, see List of Sussex County Cricket Club grounds

Warwickshire
For a full list of grounds that Warwickshire County Cricket Club have used as home grounds in first-class, List A or Twenty20 cricket, see List of Warwickshire County Cricket Club grounds

Westmorland
For a full list of grounds that Cumberland County Cricket Club have used as home grounds in List A, Minor Counties Championship or MCCA Knockout Trophy cricket that have been based in Westmorland, see List of Cumberland County Cricket Club grounds

Wiltshire
For a full list of grounds that Wiltshire County Cricket Club have used as home grounds in List A, Minor Counties Championship or MCCA Knockout Trophy cricket, see List of Wiltshire County Cricket Club grounds

Worcestershire
For a full list of grounds that Worcestershire County Cricket Club have used as home grounds in Minor Counties Championship, first-class, List A or Twenty20 cricket, see List of Worcestershire County Cricket Club grounds

Yorkshire
For a full list of grounds that Yorkshire County Cricket Club have used as home grounds in first-class, List A or Twenty20 cricket, see List of Yorkshire County Cricket Club grounds

† = Defunct venue

Domestic grounds in Wales

Glamorgan
For the SWALEC Stadium, see Test grounds
For a full list of grounds that Glamorgan County Cricket Club have used as home grounds in Minor Counties Championship, first-class, List A or Twenty20 cricket, see List of Glamorgan County Cricket Club grounds
For grounds in Glamorgan used solely by Wales Minor Counties Cricket Club (Pontarddulais Park and Sully Centurions Cricket Club Ground) as home grounds in List A, Minor Counties Championship, or MCCA Knockout Trophy cricket, see List of Wales Minor Counties Cricket Club grounds

Other Welsh counties
For grounds in the historic Welsh counties of Breconshire, Caernarvonshire, Cardiganshire, Carmarthenshire, Denbighshire, Flintshire, Monmouthshire, Pembrokeshire that have been used in first-class List A, Twenty20, Minor Counties Championship or MCCA Knockout Trophy matches, see List of Glamorgan County Cricket Club grounds and List of Wales Minor Counties Cricket Club grounds

See also
List of Test cricket grounds
List of British stadiums by capacity
List of cricket grounds by capacity

References

Bibliography
 
 
 
 
 
 Milton H (1979) Kent cricket grounds, in The Cricket Statistician, no.28, December 1979, pp. 2–10.
 Milton H (2020) Kent County Cricket Grounds. Woking: Pitch Publishing. 
 
 

 
 
Cricket grounds in England and Wales
Cricket grounds in England and Wales
Cri
Eng